The Arden Buck equations are a group of empirical correlations that relate the saturation vapor pressure to temperature for moist air. The curve fits have been optimized for more accuracy than the Goff–Gratch equation in the range .

A set of several equations were developed, each of which is applicable in a different situation.

Formula

 ,                   over liquid water,  > 0 °C

 ,                   over ice,  < 0 °C

where:
 is the saturation vapor pressure in hPa
 is the exponential function
 is the air temperature in degrees Celsius

Buck (1981) also lists enhancement factors for a temperature range of −80 to 50 °C (−112 to 122 °F) at pressures of 1,000 mb, 500 mb, and 250 mb. These coefficients are listed in the table below.

See also
Vapour pressure of water
Antoine equation
Tetens equation
Lee–Kesler method
Goff–Gratch equation

Notes

References

External links
Web Page listing various vapor pressure equations (for below 0 °C)

Atmospheric thermodynamics
Psychrometrics